San Vicente de Bique is a town in Arraiján District in the Panamá Oeste Province of Panama.

References

Populated places in Panamá Province